Feldkahl is a small river in Bavaria, Germany. It flows into the Kahl in Schimborn.

See also
List of rivers of Bavaria

Rivers of Bavaria
Rivers of the Spessart
Rivers of Germany